The New England Patriots are a professional American football team based in Foxborough, Massachusetts. They are a member of the East Division of the American Football Conference (AFC) in the National Football League (NFL).  The team began as the Boston Patriots in the American Football League, a league which merged with the National Football League before the 1970 season.

There have been 14 head coaches for the Patriots franchise. Lou Saban became the first coach of the Patriots in 1960, although he was fired part way through their second season.  Bill Belichick, the current coach since 2000, has led the team for more regular season games (288), post-season games (37) and more complete seasons (18) than any other head coach.  His 214 wins with the Patriots are far and away the most in franchise history, more than three times those of runner-up Mike Holovak.  Belichick has also led the team to nine of their eleven Super Bowl appearances, winning six of them.  Holovak, Raymond Berry and Bill Parcells all led the Patriots to league championship games, with only one coach failing to reach the Super Bowl.  Five Patriots head coaches, Holovak, Chuck Fairbanks, Berry, Parcells, and Belichick, have been named coach of the year by at least one major news organization.  Additionally, Raymond Berry is a member of the Pro Football Hall of Fame, having been inducted in 1973, eleven years before he became the Patriots' head coach.

Twice in Patriots history there were "interim" head coaches.  In 1972, John Mazur resigned with five games left in the season. Phil Bengtson was named as the interim head coach for the rest of the season, during which he only won one game, and he was not made the permanent coach the next year.  In 1978, head coach  Fairbanks secretly made a deal to leave the team to coach the University of Colorado Buffaloes while he was still coaching Patriots. Team owner Billy Sullivan suspended Fairbanks for the final game of the regular season, stating "You cannot serve two masters," and Ron Erhardt and Hank Bullough took co-head coaching responsibilities for that game. Fairbanks was reinstated when the team qualified for the playoffs, and he lost the first playoff game, his last for the Patriots.

Key

Coaches
Note: Statistics are accurate through the end of the 2021 NFL season.

Notes and references

 
 
New England Patriots
New England Patriots
Head coaches